Alejandro Pérez (born September 2, 1989) is a Mexican mixed martial artist who competed in the bantamweight division of the Ultimate Fighting Championship (UFC). He was the bantamweight winner of The Ultimate Fighter: Latin America.

Mixed martial arts career

Early career
Pérez made his professional mixed martial arts debut in 2005 at the age of 16, competing for regional promotions across Mexico. He was able to compile a record of 14-5 before trying out for The Ultimate Fighter in 2014.

The Ultimate Fighter: Latin America
In May 2014, it was revealed that Pérez was a cast member of The Ultimate Fighter: Latin America, competing for Team Velasquez.

Over the course of the show, Pérez first defeated Fredy Serrano in the quarterfinals via unanimous decision. In the semifinals, Pérez went on to defeat Guido Cannetti via knockout in the first round to reach the finals.

Ultimate Fighting Championship
Pérez made his official UFC debut on November 15, 2014 at UFC 180, facing fellow castmate, and former opponent José Alberto Quiñónez in the bantamweight finals. Pérez defeated Quiñónez via unanimous decision to become the tournament winner.

For his second fight with the promotion, Pérez faced Patrick Williams on June 13, 2015 at UFC 188. He lost the fight via submission in the first round.
  
Pérez faced Scott Jorgensen on November 21, 2015 at The Ultimate Fighter Latin America 2 Finale. He won the fight via TKO in the second round after Jorgensen was unable to continue after injuring his ankle.

Pérez faced Ian Entwistle on April 10, 2016 at UFC Fight Night 86. He won the fight via TKO in the first round and also earned a Performance of the Night bonus.

Pérez was expected to face Manny Gamburyan on September 17, 2016 at UFC Fight Night 94. However, Gamburyan pulled out of the fight in mid-August for undisclosed personal reasons and was replaced by Albert Morales. The fight was scored a majority draw.

Pérez was expected to face Rob Font on December 3, 2016 at The Ultimate Fighter 24 Finale. However, Pérez pulled out of the fight on November 24. He was replaced by promotional newcomer Matt Schnell.

Pérez faced Andre Soukhamthath on August 5, 2017 at UFC Fight Night 114. He won the fight by split decision.

Pérez faced Iuri Alcântara on December 9, 2017 at UFC Fight Night 123. He won the fight by unanimous decision.

Pérez faced Matthew Lopez on April 14, 2018 at UFC on Fox 29. He won the fight via TKO in the second round.

Pérez faced Eddie Wineland on July 14, 2018 at UFC Fight Night 133. He was awarded a unanimous decision.

Pérez was expected to face Song Yadong on March 2, 2019 at UFC 235. However, it was reported on January 11, 2019 that he pulled out on January 11 due to undisclosed reasons. He was replaced by Cody Stamann. Pérez lost the fight by unanimous decision. The bout against Yadong Song was rescheduled and eventually took place on July 6, 2019 at UFC 239. Pérez lost the fight via knockout in the first round.

Pérez was expected to face Thomas Almeida on  October 11, 2020 at UFC Fight Night 179. However, it was announced on October 2 that Pérez was forced out due to testing positive for COVID-19. 

Pérez faced Johnny Eduardo on October 2, 2021 at UFC Fight Night 193. He won the fight via a scarf hold armlock in round two. This win earned him the Performance of the Night award.

Pérez faced Jonathan Martinez on February 26, 2022 at UFC Fight Night 202. He lost the fight via unanimous decision.

In January 2023, it was announced that Perez had been released by the UFC.

Championships and accomplishments
Ultimate Fighting Championship
The Ultimate Fighter: Latin America Tournament Winner
Performance of the Night (Two Times)

Mixed martial arts record

|-
|Loss
| align=center|22–9–1
|Jonathan Martinez
|Decision (unanimous)
|UFC Fight Night: Makhachev vs. Green
|
|align=center|3
|align=center|5:00
|Las Vegas, Nevada, United States
|
|-
|Win
| align=center|22–8–1
| Johnny Eduardo
| Submission (scarf hold armlock)
| UFC Fight Night: Santos vs. Walker
| 
| align=center|2
| align=center|4:13
| Las Vegas, Nevada, United States
| 
|-
|Loss
|align=center|21–8–1
|Song Yadong
|KO (punch) 
|UFC 239 
|
|align=center|1
|align=center|2:04
|Las Vegas, Nevada, United States
|
|-
|Loss
|align=center|21–7–1
|Cody Stamann
|Decision (unanimous)
|UFC 235 
|
|align=center|3
|align=center|5:00
|Las Vegas, Nevada, United States
|
|-
|Win
|align=center|21–6–1
|Eddie Wineland
|Decision (unanimous)
|UFC Fight Night: dos Santos vs. Ivanov 
|
|align=center|3
|align=center|5:00
|Boise, Idaho, United States
|
|- 
|Win
|align=center|20–6–1
|Matthew Lopez
|TKO (knees and punches)
|UFC on Fox: Poirier vs. Gaethje
|
|align=center|2
|align=center|3:42
|Glendale, Arizona, United States
|
|- 
|Win
|align=center|19–6–1
|Iuri Alcântara
|Decision (unanimous)
|UFC Fight Night: Swanson vs. Ortega 
|
|align=center|3
|align=center|5:00
|Fresno, California, United States
|
|-
|Win
|align=center|18–6–1
|Andre Soukhamthath
|Decision (split)
|UFC Fight Night: Pettis vs. Moreno
|
|align=center|3
|align=center|5:00
|Mexico City, Mexico
|
|-
|Draw
|align=center|17–6–1
|Albert Morales
|Draw (majority)
|UFC Fight Night: Poirier vs. Johnson
|
|align=center|3
|align=center|5:00
|Hidalgo, Texas, United States
|
|-
|Win
|align=center|17–6
|Ian Entwistle
| TKO (punches)
|UFC Fight Night: Rothwell vs. dos Santos
|
|align=center|1
|align=center|4:04
|Zagreb, Croatia
|
|-
|Win
|align=center|16–6
|Scott Jorgensen 
|TKO (ankle injury)
|The Ultimate Fighter Latin America 2 Finale: Magny vs. Gastelum
|
|align=center|2
|align=center|4:26
|Monterrey, Mexico
| 
|-
|Loss
|align=center| 15–6
|Patrick Williams
|Technical Submission (guillotine choke)
|UFC 188
|
|align=center| 1
|align=center| 0:23
|Mexico City, Mexico
|
|-
|Win
|align=center| 15–5
|José Alberto Quiñónez
|Decision (unanimous)
|UFC 180
|
|align=center| 3
|align=center| 5:00
|Mexico City, Mexico
|
|-
|Win
|align=center| 14–5
|Wanderson Marinho
|Submission (rear-naked choke)
|Jungle Fight 59
|
|align=center| 2
|align=center| 1:15
|Rio de Janeiro, Brazil
|
|-
|Loss
|align=center| 13–5
|José Alberto Quiñónez
|Decision (unanimous)
|Fight Club Mexico 3
|
|align=center| 3
|align=center| 5:00
|Aguascalientes, Mexico
|
|-
|Win
|align=center| 13–4
|Carlo Medina
|TKO (punches)
|Kamikaze Fight League 2
|
|align=center| 1
|align=center| 1:49
|Puerto Vallarta, Mexico
|
|-
|Win
|align=center| 12–4
|Masio Fullen
|Decision (unanimous)
|Xtreme Combat 14
|
|align=center| 3
|align=center| 5:00
|Mexico City, Mexico
|
|-
|Win
|align=center| 11–4
|Fabian Galvan
|Decision (unanimous)
|The Supreme Cage 1
|
|align=center| 3
|align=center| 5:00
|Monterrey, Mexico
|
|-
|Loss
|align=center| 10–4
|Masio Fullen
|TKO (punches)
|Total Fight Championship
|
|align=center| 1
|align=center| 4:00
|Guadalajara, Mexico
|
|-
|Win
|align=center| 10–3
|Gilberto Aguilar
|Decision (unanimous)
|Supreme Combat Challenge 4
|
|align=center| 3
|align=center| 5:00
|Guadalajara, Mexico
|
|-
|Win
|align=center| 9–3
|Rodolfo Rubio Pérez
|TKO (punches)
|Total Combat 33
|
|align=center| 2
|align=center| 0:51
|Mexico City, Mexico
|
|-
|Win
|align=center| 8–3
|Jorge Pineda
|TKO (punches)
|Black FC 5
|
|align=center| 2
|align=center| 0:45
|Zapopan, Mexico
|
|-
|Win
|align=center| 7–3
|Victor Jauregui
|TKO (punches)
|MMA Xtreme 22
|
|align=center| 1
|align=center| N/A
|Mexico City, Mexico
|
|-
|Win
|align=center| 6–3
|Gaston Pérez
|Submission (rear-naked choke)
|Black FC 3
|
|align=center| 1
|align=center| 1:06
|Zapopan, Mexico
|
|-
|Loss
|align=center| 5–3
|Kevin Dunsmoor
|Submission (armbar)
|MMA Xtreme 21
|
|align=center| 2
|align=center| 1:27
|Mexico City, Mexico
|
|-
|Win
|align=center| 5–2
|Carlos de Luna
|Submission (triangle choke)
|MMA Xtreme 19
|
|align=center| 1
|align=center| 1:49
|Cancun, Mexico
|
|-
|Loss
|align=center| 4–2
|Ivan Lopez
|Decision (unanimous)
|MMA Xtreme 18
|
|align=center| 3
|align=center| 5:00
|Tijuana, Mexico
|
|-
|Win
|align=center| 4–1
|Jorge Pineda
|TKO (punches)
|Black FC 2
|
|align=center| 1
|align=center| 1:44
|Zapopan, Mexico
|
|-
|Loss
|align=center| 3–1
|Chris David
|Submission (armbar)
|MMA Xtreme 11
|
|align=center| 2
|align=center| 0:36
|Mexico City, Mexico
|
|-
|Win
|align=center| 3–0
|Roberto Esparaza
|KO (punches)
|MMA Xtreme 2
|
|align=center| 1
|align=center| N/A
|Mexico City, Mexico
|
|-
|Win
|align=center| 2–0
|Marcello Porto
|Submission (guillotine choke)
|Espartan Fighting 7
|
|align=center| 1
|align=center| N/A
|Monterrey, Mexico
|
|-
|Win
|align=center| 1–0
|Mario Rivera
|Submission (rear-naked choke)
|Gladiator Challenge 39
|
|align=center| 1
|align=center| 2:11
|Porterville, California, United States
|
|-
|}

See also

 List of male mixed martial artists

References

External links

Living people
1989 births
Mexican male mixed martial artists
Bantamweight mixed martial artists
Sportspeople from Aguascalientes
Ultimate Fighting Championship male fighters
People from Aguascalientes City